Karaba may refer to:

Karaba, Burkina Faso
Karaba, Mali
Karaba, Kenya (Nyeri County)